Benjamin David Johnson (born May 11, 1986) is an American football coach and former player who is the offensive coordinator for the Detroit Lions of the National Football League (NFL).

Playing career 
Johnson was a walk-on quarterback at North Carolina from 2004 to 2007, and graduated from North Carolina with a degree in mathematics and computer science.

Coaching career

Boston College 
Johnson began his coaching career at Boston College as a graduate assistant in 2009. He was promoted to tight ends coach in 2011.

Miami Dolphins 
Johnson was named an offensive assistant for the Miami Dolphins on February 10, 2012. He was promoted to assistant quarterbacks coach in 2013, and served as the team's tight ends coach after Dan Campbell was named the Dolphins interim head coach for the final 12 games of the 2015 season. Johnson was reassigned to assistant wide receivers coach in 2017 under Adam Gase. In 2018 he was promoted to wide receivers coach.

Detroit Lions 
Johnson was named an offensive quality control coach for the Detroit Lions in 2019. He was promoted to tight ends coach in 2020, and was retained by the Lions when Campbell was hired as their head coach in 2021. During the 2021 season, Johnson saw his role increase into a passing game coordinator as then Lions offensive coordinator Anthony Lynn's role was decreasing. Johnson was subsequently promoted to offensive coordinator after the season.

Personal life

Johnson is married to his wife Jessica and they have two children, a daughter named Emory and a son named Kennedy.

References

External links 
 Detroit Lions profile
 Miami Dolphins profile
 North Carolina profile

1986 births
Living people
Boston College Eagles football coaches
Detroit Lions coaches
Miami Dolphins coaches
North Carolina Tar Heels football players
Sportspeople from Asheville, North Carolina
National Football League offensive coordinators